The Jeir Creek, a perennial river that is part of the Murrumbidgee catchment within the Murray–Darling basin, is located in the South West Slopes region of New South Wales, Australia.

Course and features 
The creek flows generally northwest by west then west by south before reaching its confluence with the Murrumbidgee River southwest of the village of Hall. The creek descends  over its  course.

The river is crossed by the Barton Highway north of the village of Hall.

The Jeir Creek Winery, located in the area, is named after the creek.

See also 

 List of rivers of New South Wales (A-K)
 Rivers of New South Wales

References

External links
Murrumbidgee Catchment Management Authority  website
 

Rivers of New South Wales
Tributaries of the Murrumbidgee River
Yass Valley Council